This a list of the best known Ukrainian mathematicians. This list includes some Polish, pre-revolutionary Russian and Soviet mathematicians who lived or worked in Ukraine.



A 
 Akhiezer, Naum Ilyich (1901–1980)

B 
 Bernstein, Sergei Natanovich (1880–1968)
 Borok, Valentina Mikhailovna (1931–2004)
 Berlyand, Leonid Viktorovich (b. 1957)

D 
 Dorohovtsev, Anatoliy Yakovych (1935–2004)
 Drinfeld, Volodymyr Gershonovych (b. 1954)

E 
 Eremenko, Oleksandr Emmanuilovich (b. 1954)

G 
 Geronimus, Yakov Lazarevich (1898–1984)
 Glushkov, Victor Mihailovich (1923–1982)
 Goldberg, Anatolii Asirovich (1930–2008)
 Grave, Dmytro Olexandrovych (1863–1939)

K 
 Kadets, Mikhail Iosiphovich (1923–2011)
 Korolyuk, Volodymyr Semenovych (1925–2020)
 Kovalenko, Ihor Mykolayovych (b. 1935)
 Kondratiev, Yuri (b. 1953)
 Koshmanenko, Volodymyr Dmytrovych (b. 1943)
 Kravchuk, Myhailo Pylypovych (1892–1942)
 Krein, Mark Grigorievich (1907–1989)
 Krylov, Mykola Mytrofanovych (1879–1955)

M 
 Marchenko, Volodymyr Olexandrovych (b. 1922)
 Mikhalevich, Volodymyr Serhiyovych (1930–1994)
 Mitropolskiy, Yurii Oleksiyovych (1917–2008)
 Maryna Viazovska (b. 1984)

N 
 Naimark, Mark Aronovich (1909–1978)

P 
 Pastur, Leonid Andriyovych (b. 1937)
 Pfeiffer, Georgii Yurii (1872–1946)
 Pogorelov, Aleksei Vasil'evich (1919–2002)

S 
 Samoilenko, Anatoliy Myhailovych (1938–2020)
 Skorokhod, Anatoliy Volodymyrovych (1930–2011)
 Shor, Naum Zuselevevich (1937–2006)

V 
 Vaschenko-Zakharchenko, Myhailo Yegorovych (1825–1912)
 Voronyi, Georgiy Feodosiyovych (1868–1908)

Y 
 Yadrenko Myhailo Yosypovych (1932–2004)

Mathematicians born in Ukraine
 Arnold, Vladimir Igorevich (b. 1937, Odessa, d. 2010, Paris)
 Besicovitch, Abram Samoilovitch (1891, Berdyansk, d. 1970, Cambridge, UK)
 Fomenko Anatoliy Timofeevich (b. 1945, Donetsk)
 Gelfand, Israel Moiseevich (b. 1913, Okny, Kherson region, d. 2009, New Brunswick, NJ)
 Shafarevich, Igor Rostislavovich (1923, Zhytomyr, d. 2017, Moscow)
 Urysohn, Pavlo Samuilovich (1898, Odessa, d. 1924, Batz-sur-Mer, France)

See also
Kharkiv Mathematical School
List of amateur mathematicians
List of mathematicians
List of Indian mathematicians
List of Slovenian mathematicians
Lwów School of Mathematics

Ukrainian mathematicians
Mathematicians